is a Japanese racewalker. In 2019, he competed in the men's 50 kilometres walk at the 2019 World Athletics Championships held in Doha, Qatar. He did not finish his race.

In 2015, he competed in the men's 20 kilometres walk at the 2015 Summer Universiade held in Gwangju, South Korea. He finished in 8th place.

In 2017, he competed in the men's 20 kilometres walk at the 2017 Summer Universiade held in Taipei, Taiwan. He finished in 7th place.

References

External links 
 

Living people
1996 births
Place of birth missing (living people)
Japanese male racewalkers
World Athletics Championships athletes for Japan
Competitors at the 2015 Summer Universiade
Competitors at the 2017 Summer Universiade
20th-century Japanese people
21st-century Japanese people